Piho is a surname and given name. Notable people with the name include:

Apii Piho (born 1960), Cook Islands politician
Han Hendrik Piho (born 1993), Estonian Nordic combined skier
Kail Piho (born 1991), Estonian Nordic combined skier
Piho Rua (born 1954), Cook Islands politician

Estonian-language surnames